Regents Park is a suburb in the City of Logan, Queensland, Australia. In the  Regents Park had a population of 10,962 people.

Geography
The suburb is approximately 5 km² (476 hectares) in area, 12% of which is taken up by five parks.

History
Regents Park was originally part of Browns Plains. It was subdivided for residential housing in the early 1974.The first name for this area was Emerald Hills hence Emerald Drive  The name Regents Park was proposed by the land developer.

St Bernardine's Catholic School opened on 27 January 1982.

Yugumbir State School opened on 28 January 1986.  The name 'Yugumbir' is an Aboriginal word for the district.

Regents Park State School opened on 1 January 1994.

In the 2011 census, Regents Park had a population of 10,657 people; the population was 50.5% female and 49.5% male. The median age of the Regents Park population was 30 years, 7 years below the Australian average. Children aged under 15 years made up 25.3% of the population and people aged 65 years and over made up 6.0% of the population. 67.1% of people living in Regents Park were born in Australia, similar to the national average of 69.8%. The other top responses for country of birth were New Zealand 9.2%, England 3.6%, Philippines 1.5%, Bosnia and Herzegovina 0.9%, South Africa 0.6%. 80.2% of people spoke only English at home; the next most popular languages were 1.3% Samoan, 1.2% Serbian, 1.2% Spanish, 0.8% Mandarin, 0.7% Croatian. The most common response for religious affiliation was No Religion 24.9%, followed by Catholic 23.1%, Anglican 15.8%, Uniting Church 5.0% and Presbyterian and Reformed 3.1%. The great majority of households (84.9%) were family households, 12.3% were single person households and 2.8% were group households. The average household size was 3.1 people. Median mortgage repayments	in Regents Park were $1,820, which is similar to the national median of $1,800.

Education
Regents Park State School is a government primary (Prep-6) school for boys and girls at Emerald Drive. In 2018, the school had an enrolment of 760 students with 58 teachers (51 full-time equivalent) and 46 non-teaching staff (34 full-time equivalent). It includes a special education program.

Yugumbir State School is a government primary (Prep-6) school for boys and girls at Vansittart Road. In 2018, the school had an enrolment of 1,086 students with 77 teachers (73 full-time equivalent) and 42 non-teaching staff (29 full-time equivalent). It includes a special education program.

St Bernardine's School is a Catholic primary (Prep-6) school for boys and girls at 25 Vergulde Road. In 2018, the school had an enrolment of 738 students with 46 teachers (41 full-time equivalent) and 28 non-teaching staff (20 full-time equivalent).

There are no secondary schools in Regents Park. The nearest government secondary schools are Browns Plains State High School in neighbouring Browns Plains to the north-west and Park Ridge State High School in neighbouring Park Ridge to the south.

Amenities 
There are a number of parks in the suburb, including:

 Acorus Park
 Charlton Street Park

 Hyde Park

 Redgum Drive Park

 Regency Park

 Regents Park
 Shannon Ramsay Park

 Waller Park

References

External links